EFP may refer to:

Politics 
 Economic Freedom Party, in Kenya
 England First Party, in England
 European Federalist Party, a pan-European political party
 Ethiopian Federal Police, law enforcement agency of Ethiopia

Professional bodies 
 École Freudienne de Paris, a former French psychoanalytic body
 European Federation for Primatology
 European Federation of Parasitologists
 European Federation of Periodontology

Other uses 
 École Franco-Polonaise, a defunct Franco-Polish School in Poznań, Poland
 Effective Fragment Potential Method
 Electronic field production
 Electronic fuel pump
 Eleven Football Pro, a Lebanese association football academy
 Eleven Football Pro WFC, a women's association football club in Beirut, Lebanon
 Elongation factor P, a prokaryotic protein translation factor
 Equestrian Federation of Pakistan
 European Film Promotion, a network of European film promotion organisations
 European Firearms Pass
 Exchange for Physicals, an off-market trading mechanism
 Explosively formed penetrator
 NATO Enhanced Forward Presence
 TRIM25, encoding the tripartite motif-containing protein 25